Hau Yung Sang (born 1917) was a former professional footballer who represented the Republic of China in 1948 Olympics and Republic of China (Taiwan) in 1954 Asian Games. He was nicknamed Flash Harry.

Honours

Republic of China
Asian Games Gold medal: 1954

References

External links

1917 births
Year of death missing
Hong Kong footballers
Chinese footballers
Taiwanese footballers
China international footballers
Chinese Taipei international footballers
Chinese Taipei international footballers from Hong Kong
Association football defenders
Hong Kong First Division League players
Footballers at the 1948 Summer Olympics
Olympic footballers of China
Dual internationalists (football)
Asian Games medalists in football
Asian Games gold medalists for Chinese Taipei
Footballers at the 1954 Asian Games
Medalists at the 1954 Asian Games